Raipur Junction is the main railway station serving the city of Raipur. It is only few of the railway stations in India which has been given the grade 'A-1' by the Indian Railways and is one of the highest-revenue-earning railway stations in India. This station is one of the prominent stations on the Howrah–Nagpur–Mumbai line. It is also the originating point of the Raipur–Vizianagarm branch line route. Raipur is the busiest railway station in South Eastern Central Railway zone.

History
The Bengal Nagpur Railway was formed in 1887 for the purpose of upgrading the Nagpur Chhattisgarh Railway and then extending it via Bilaspur to Asansol. The Bengal Nagpur Railway main line from Nagpur to Asansol, on the Howrah–Delhi main line, was opened for goods traffic on 1 February 1891.

The  Vizianagaram–Parvatipuram line was opened in 1908–09 and an extension to Salur was built in 1913. The Parvatipuram–Raipur line was completed in 1931.

Electrification
The Bilaspur–Bhilai section was  electrified in 1935–45.

References

External links

Railway junction stations in Chhattisgarh
Railway stations in Raipur district
Transport in Raipur, Chhattisgarh
Buildings and structures in Raipur, Chhattisgarh
Railway stations in India opened in 1888
Raipur railway division